Matsutaro Shoriki Award is named in honor of Matsutarō Shōriki, the owner of the Yomiuri Shimbun, whose achievements earned him the label of the real parent of present day Japanese professional baseball. The prize was founded in 1977.

It is presented to a person (a manager or player) who greatly contributed to the development of professional baseball. A gold medal and the prize of 5 million yen are awarded to the recipient. The prize money is provided by Yomiuri Shimbun and Nihon Television.

Recipients

See also

References

Nippon Professional Baseball trophies and awards
Awards established in 1977
1977 establishments in Japan